Wabayuma Peak Wilderness is a protected wilderness area centered around its namesake Wabayuma Peak, rising to 7,601 feet (2316 m) in the Hualapai Mountains in the U.S. state of Arizona.  Established in 1990 under the Arizona Desert Wilderness Act the area is managed by the Bureau of Land Management. This desert and mountain wilderness exists in between the Sonoran and Mojave Deserts, filled with massive ridgelines that rise from the desert floor. 

Vegetation in the mountains is mostly chaparral and pinyon-juniper woodlands, on the higher sections close to the peaks there are groves of ponderosa pine and gambel oak.

See also
 List of Arizona Wilderness Areas
 List of U.S. Wilderness Areas

References

External links
 Wabayuma Peak Trail – BLM
 
 

IUCN Category Ib
Wilderness areas of Arizona
Protected areas of Maricopa County, Arizona
Protected areas established in 1990
1990 establishments in Arizona